Emerson da Silva Leal or simply Emerson  (born July 3, 1980 in Esteio), is a Brazilian defensive midfielder. In 2012, he played for Aimoré.

Following the diagnosis of a heart condition in November 2004, Emerson did not play for three years. He re-joined Grêmio in 2007. Despite having a contract with Grêmio, Émerson did not usually train with the rest of Grêmio players.

Honours
Brazilian Cup: 2001
Rio Grande do Sul State League: 2001

References

External links
 zerozero.pt
 CBF
 Emerson, del Gremio, apartado del equipo por sufrir problemas cardíacos

1980 births
Living people
Brazilian footballers
Grêmio Foot-Ball Porto Alegrense players
Sport Club do Recife players
Esporte Clube Novo Hamburgo players
Canoas Sport Club players
Esporte Clube Juventude players
Association football midfielders